t Woudt is a small village in the Dutch province of South Holland. It is located about 5 km southwest of the city of Delft, in the municipality of Midden-Delfland.

't Woudt (then spelled t Woud") was a separate municipality between 1812 and 1817, when it was divided into Groeneveld, Hoog en Woud Harnasch, and a part that merged with Hof van Delft.

References

External links
't Woudt and Midden-Delfland Mooi Dichtbij portaal

Populated places in South Holland
Former municipalities of South Holland
Midden-Delfland